Aloe thraskii, the dune aloe, is a South African plant in the genus Aloe.

Description
 

The dune aloe is a tall, fast-growing, un-branched aloe, which develops a very large rosette. The long, pale, grey-green leaves are deeply grooved or channeled (U-shaped in cross-section) and recurve downwards.

The orange and yellow flowers grow in short, compact, cylindrical racemes, on multi-branched inflorescences.

Distribution
These plants are naturally found in dune vegetation along the coast of KwaZulu-Natal and the Eastern Cape of South Africa.

See also
 Maputaland-Pondoland-Albany Hotspot

References

thraskii
Plants described in 1880
Flora of the Cape Provinces
Flora of KwaZulu-Natal
Taxa named by John Gilbert Baker